L’Église de la rue Belliard was a Brussels-based evangelical Protestant congregation, started in 1837 when a group left the Temple de l'Observatoire Protestant church.

History 

L’Église de la rue Belliard originally met on rue du Jeu de paume under pastor Denis Lourde-Laplace, then on 24 rue Ducale under the ministry of pastor Edouard Panchaud (1839–1862). In 1851 the congregation built an Evangelical Chapel on 13 rue Belliard in the new Leopold quarter in Brussels.

Over the years L’Église de la rue Belliard and the Temple de l'Observatoire divided and rejoined several times before finally reuniting in 1973 to become L’Église Protestante Bruxelles-Botanique.

The church building on rue Belliard was sold in 1974 and a new building on boulevard Bisschoffsheim dedicated in 1977.

List of pastors 

Succession of pastors at L’Église de la rue Belliard
 Denis LOURDE-LAPLACE 1837–1839
 Edouard PANCHAUD 1839–1862
 Clément de FAYE 1863–1876
 Félix DUCASSE 1876–1879
 Léonard ANET 1879–1880
 Charles BYSE 1880–1882
 Rodolphe MEYHOFFER 1882–1917
 Henri MERLE D’AUBIGNE 1887–1892
 Jean MEYHOFFER 1917–1927
 Jules PERREGOUX 1924–1927
 Daniel LEMAIRE 1928–1933
 Emile HOYOIS (B) 1933–1935
 Robert DU PASQUIER 1935–1946
 Fritz HOYOIS 1942–1945
 André CLERC 1945–1957
 Denise PICCARD 1952–1954
 Denise WOHLWERTH (assistant) 1954–1955
 Martin BEUKENHORST (assistant) 1954–1955
 Maurice RAYMOND (assistant) 1954–1955
 Victor PHILDIUS (assistant) 1954–1955
 Rodolphe GILLY 1957–1964
 Jean-Claude BORDIER 1960–1969
 Pierre REGARD 1964–1972
 Emile LE COZANNET 1970–1977

References 

Protestant churches in Belgium
Churches in Brussels
19th century in Brussels
20th century in Brussels
City of Brussels
19th-century churches in Belgium
19th-century Protestant churches